is a novel series created by American authors Bradley Bond and Philip "Ninj@" Morzez. After they gave permission for Japanese translations to be published via Twitter, Enterbrain published the first translated novel in September 2012, with illustrations by Warainaku. Sixteen novels have been released as of June 2016. It has received three manga adaptations. An ONA adaptation produced by Trigger and directed by Akira Amemiya which aired from April to October 2015.

Plot
The story takes place in the cyberpunk metropolis of Neo-Saitama. After his wife and child are killed in a ninja turf war, salaryman Kenji Fujikido gets possessed by a mysterious ninja soul known as Naraku Ninja. As Naraku's craving for massacring the evil ninja overlaps with Fujikido's lust for revenge, together they bring Ninja Slayer – a terrifying ninja-killing grim reaper - into existence. The more their mental resonance and physical symbiosis deepens, the more powerful Ninja Slayer becomes. If Fujikido completely surrenders himself to Naraku, he will be unstoppable, at the cost of Naraku being able to massacre freely without restraint.

Characters
 / 

A man who becomes a ninja in order to eliminates other ninjas and get revenge on the ones that got his family killed, the Soukai Syndicate. His ninja soul is the Naraku Ninja.
 / 

 A high ranking ninja who serves Khan and the Soukai Syndicate. He is also responsible for killing Kenji's wife and child.

A journalist who seeks the truth and follows Ninja Slayer around. She has special hacking skills and can directly connect herself to cyberspace.

 A teenage girl who is also a ninja and later becomes a comrade of Ninja Slayer. Her ninja soul is the Shi Ninja.
 / 

 An experienced kunoichi and Gendoso's granddaughter who helps out Ninja Slayer from time to time. Unlike the Ninja Slayer and Yamoto, she is an actual ninja.

The head of the Dragon Dojo and the last real ninja in Japan. He is also Ninja Slayer's master.

The leader of the Soukai Syndicate, he possesses seven different Ninja Souls collectively known as Demolition Ninja.

 / 

A ninja with cancer on the verge of dying. He's hired to kill criminals and ninjas to test new weapons. He is Yamoto's sensei and is an iaido master.

Media

Novels
Ninja Slayer was originally posted piece by piece on Twitter by Japanese "translators" Honda Yu and Sugi Leika, allegedly adapting the story from American authors "Bradley Bond and Philip "Ninj@" Morzez". After the series grew in popularity, Enterbrain published the first Japanese-translated volume in print, Ninja Slayer: Neo-Saitama in Flames, in September 2012. There appears to be no evidence of an original copy of Ninja Slayer, and the original creators "Bradley Bond and Philip Ninj@ Morzez" appear to be fictional authors created to produce the illusion of an elaborate backstory, and have no record of an accurate bio.

Manga
A manga adaptation with art by Yūki Yogo and scripted by Yoshiaki Tabata is serialized in Kadokawa Shoten's Comp Ace since June 27, 2013. It has been collected in currently five tankōbon volumes. Another manga adaptation titled  with art by Ageha Saotome also began serialization from July 1, 2013, in Enterbrain's shōjo manga magazine B's-Log Comic. It has also been collected into three tankōbon volumes. A third adaptation titled  is serialized in Kodansha's Suiyoubi no Sirius.

Volume list
Ninja Slayer

Anime
In April 2014, Enterbrain announced that an anime adaptation of the novel was in production, later revealing that it was being produced by Trigger. More details were announced in Los Angeles, CA at Anime Expo 2014. The anime, titled Ninja Slayer From Animation, is directed by Akira Amamiya, and the main theme is "Back In Black" performed by electronic band Boom Boom Satellites. The anime premiered on Niconico on April 16, 2015, and a television broadcast started airing in April 2016. The series is licensed in North America by Funimation, who is simulcasting the series with subtitles and began streaming a dubbed version from May 21, 2015. Anime Limited announced that they had acquired the series in the United Kingdom and Ireland, however, later announced that they had cancelled the release.

Episode list

References

External links
 Official website
 Official website 
 Official website (anime) 
 

2012 science fiction novels
2012 Japanese novels
2015 anime ONAs
Anime and manga based on novels
Cyberpunk anime and manga
Cyberpunk novels
Enterbrain
Enterbrain manga
Funimation
Japanese science fiction novels
Josei manga
Kadokawa Shoten manga
Kadokawa Dwango franchises
Kodansha manga
Madman Entertainment anime
Mythopoeia
Ninja in anime and manga
Seinen manga
Shōnen manga
Television shows based on novels
Studio Trigger
Vertical (publisher) titles